Conor is a male given name of Irish origin. The meaning of the name is "Lover of Wolves" or "Lover of Hounds". Conchobhar/Conchubhar or from the name Conaire, found in Irish legend as the name of the high king Conaire Mór and other heroes. It is popular in the English-speaking world. Conor has recently become a popular name in North America and in Great Britain. Some alternative spellings for the name are often spelled Connor, Conner and sometimes Konnor.

The name is occasionally also used as a female given name.

Notable people named Conor 
Men

 Conor Brady, former editor of The Irish Times
 Conor Burns, British politician
 Conor Casey, American soccer player
 Conor Coady, English footballer
 Conor Cruise O'Brien, Irish politician and commentator
 Conor Daly, American racecar driver
 Conor Deasy, indie-pop singer
 Conor P. Delaney, Irish-American surgeon
 Conor Garvey ( 2010s), Irish Gaelic footballer
 Conor Gibbons, Irish Gaelic footballer
 Conor Gill, lacrosse player
 Conor Grace, Irish professional basketball player
 Conor Henderson, English-Irish footballer
 Conor Jackson, Boston Red Sox outfielder
 Conor Knighton, San Francisco-based actor
 Conor Lamb, American Politician
 Conor Lenihan, Irish politician
 Conor Maynard, musician and YouTuber
 Conor MacNeill, Northern Irish actor
 Conor McBride, computer scientist
 Conor McDermott, American football player
 Conor McCann, Northern Irish hurler
 Conor McCarthy (Gaelic footballer), Irish Gaelic footballer
 Conor McGregor, MMA fighter
 Conor McPherson, Irish playwright
 Conor Murphy, Irish politician
 Conor Murray, Irish rugby union player
 Conor Niland, Irish tennis player
 Conor Oberst, American singer-songwriter best known for his work in the band Bright Eyes
 Conor O'Brian (born 1980), ring name of American professional wrestler Ryan Parmeter, also known as Konnor
Conor O'Brien, Irish singer-songwriter best known for his work in the band Villagers
 Conor O'Clery, Irish journalist
 Conor O'Shea, former rugby player, current Italian rugby head coach
 Conor O'Sullivan (disambiguation)
 Conor Sheary, American ice hockey player
 Conor Sinnott, (born 1986), Irish footballer
 Conor

Women
 Conor Leslie, American actor

Fictional characters 
 Conor Larkin, hero of the book Trinity by Leon Uris

See also 
List of Irish-language given names
Connor (disambiguation)

References 

English masculine given names
Irish masculine given names